Manfred Walter is a former Swiss slalom canoeist who competed in the 1970s. He won a silver medal in the C-2 team event at the 1977 ICF Canoe Slalom World Championships in Spittal.

References

External links 
 Manfred WALTER at CanoeSlalom.net

Swiss male canoeists
Living people
Year of birth missing (living people)
Medalists at the ICF Canoe Slalom World Championships